Tactical (in the military context) refers to the lowest level of military strategy, usually consisting of individual combatant or small unit actions. These take place under the umbrella of larger scale more comprehensive and large-scale operational, theater and strategic levels. 

In short, strategic-level thinking determines "why" the war is taking place, theater and operational-level thinking determines the "who, what and where" of the war, while tactics determine the "how".
 
Tactical Response Team
Tactical combat
Tactical intelligence and related activities
Tactical role-playing game
Tactical airlift

Other uses 
 Tactical, an album by the American death metal band World Under Blood
 Tactical, 2008 film with Eric Lane (actor)

See also 
 Military tactics